This is a partial list of hospitals in Afghanistan. In 2004, there were 117 private and government-run hospitals in the country. Their number has gradually increased to over 3,000. Nearly all districts of Afghanistan have at least one government-run hospital.

See also
 Healthcare in Afghanistan

References 

 List of hospitals in Afghanistan
Hospitals
Afghanistan, List of hospitals in
Afghanistan